John Patrick Toll (7 December 1914 – 1972) was an English professional footballer who played as an inside forward.

References

1914 births
1972 deaths
English footballers
Bridlington Town A.F.C. players
Burnley F.C. players
English Football League players
Footballers from Bradford
Association football inside forwards